A bus carrying Argentine frontier police plunged off a bridge in rural northern Argentina, killing 43 and injuring 8.

Causes
The crash took place at the National Route 34, which has little maintenance and many potholes. Areas near bridges are more susceptible to collisions, as the frequent braking of heavy trucks before crossing them damages the roads even further. According to investigations, the tires of the bus blew out some yards before a bridge, which caused the driver to lose control of the vehicle.

Reactions
President Mauricio Macri, who had just took office, sent his condolences to the relatives of the victims. He said that "We have to improve the country roads, so that these things don’t keep happening". The Plan Belgrano, announced a short time before, was aimed to improve the poorly maintained infrastructure at the Argentine northern provinces. He also declared a national day of mourning.

See also
List of road accidents (2010–present)

References

Bus incidents in Argentina
Argentina road accident
Road accident
Salta Province
2015 disasters in Argentina